X Factor is a Romanian television music competition that aims to find a new music talent to become a star. The fifth season will start airing on 17 September 2015 on Antena 1.

The hosts are the same as in the first four seasons: Răzvan Simion and Dani Oțil, who are also known for hosting a well known morning show on Antena 1. Delia Matache, Horia Brenciu and Ștefan Bănică, Jr. returned to the judging panel.

On December 27, 2015, the season concluded and was won by Florin Răduţă, mentored by Bănică. Xenia Chitoroagă, mentored also by Bănică finished in second place.

Judges

 Delia Matache

Delia Matache is a famous Romanian eurobeat singer-songwriter, TV celebrity, dancer, philanthropist, former model, fashion designer. She has started her stage music activity in 1999 in N&D music band with Nicolae Marin and had released 4 albums, and after the split off in 2003 she had released another two solo albums.

 Horia Brenciu

Horia Brenciu is a Romanian singer, television host for the Romanian version of Dancing with the Stars, successful entertainer, and philanthropist. He studied at National College Andrei Şaguna from Braşov, then he continued to Şcoala Populară de Artă Braşov, at piano and canto class, and in 1998 he finished The Theater Academy in Bucharest.

 Ștefan Bănică, Jr.

Ștefan Bănică, Jr. is a Romanian entertainer, of roma people origin from his father side, TV presenter, one of the most important Romanian TV personality, the son of actor Ștefan Bănică.  He is well known in Romanian for presenting the Romania version of "Dancing with the Stars", the most longevive dance competition ever aired in Romania, broadcast on Pro TV.

Auditions

Audition process was based on the British and American version. First up were "The Producer's Audition", where the producers chose singers to proceed to the second phase which was "The Audition before the Judging panel". The first auditions took place at Craiova, on 26 April 2015.  They then took place in Sibiu, on 28 April, in Arad, on April 30, in Cluj Napoca on May 2, 2015, on May 5 in Iași, on May 8 in Galați, May 10 in Bucharest and concluded on May 16, 2015 in Chișinău, Moldova.

The auditions were broadcast from 17 September 2015 until 20 November 2015. The auditions consisted in 11 episodes.

Bootcamp
This season, the categories follow the age-based format from the past two seasons. The judges learnt which category they will mentor after the Auditions 11. Brenciu will mentor the Groups, Bănică the Under 20s and for the second time, Matache will mentor the Over 20s.

Complete Teams
Color key
 – Eliminated in Six-chair challenge
 – Eliminated in Duels
 – Finalist
 – Wildcard

Six-chair challenge
Like last season, the stage called "The Six-Chair challenge" will be back. This season, the categories follow the age-based format from season four. From the 42 acts competing, at the end of this round, only 18 acts will go further in the competition.

The Six-Chair Challenge consisted in three editions that were broadcast on November 27, December 4 and December 9, 2015.							
 
Color key
 – Contestant was immediately eliminated after performance without switch
 – Contestant was switched out later in the competition and eventually eliminated
 – Contestant was not switched out and made the final six of their own category

The Duels
After the Six-chair challenge, each mentor will have six contestants for the Duels. Each contestant will sing a song of their own choice, back to back, and each duel concludes with the respective mentor eliminating one of the two contestants; the three winners for each mentor will advance to the Live shows.

The Duels were broadcast on December 11, 2015.

Colour key:

 - Artist won the Duel and advanced to the Live shows

 - Artist lost the Duel and was eliminated

Wildcard
In this season, the public will have the chance to save one of the acts that competed in the Auditions. The most voted act will go directly to the Live Shows. In the first live show if one of the mentor decides to take him in his team, then he will go further in the competition, otherwise he will be sent home. On December 18, 2015, Xenia Chitoroagă was declared the winner public.

Finalists
The ten finalists will compete in the Live Shows.
Color Key
 – Winner
 – Runner-up
 – Third place

Live shows

Results summary
Color key

Live show details

Live Show 1 - December 18, 2015
 Theme: Romanian Gala
 Group performance: "Gură, taci!", "Cum ne noi", "A naibii dragoste"
 Musical guests: Jo, Nadir, Uddi and Randi ("Aseară ți-am luat basma", "Melodia mea" și "Până vara viitoare"), Nicoleta Nucă ("Nu sunt", "Adevăr sau minciună" feat. Cabron) 

Judges' votes to eliminate
 Brenciu: Tomato  - He stated that "My decision today is based on one thing: those who have given me more emotions and can win X Factor! I will go further along with Bravissimo!"
 Matache: Alex Vasilache - gave no reason.
 Bănică : Erika Isac - He stated that "For me it was an experience! Today evening, my vote would be like this: who was the most motivated ?! The competitor who was the most motivated and understood what I wanted from him was Endy Glikman! "

Live Show 2 - December 25, 2015

 Theme:  Show Song, Christmas Song
 Musical guests:  Gabriel Cotabiță - "Noapte albastră"

Notes
 This week featured a triple elimination. The three acts with the fewest votes were eliminated.

Live Show 3: Final - December 27, 2015

Round 1
Theme:  Duet with special guest and with their mentor
Musical guests: Tudor Turcu, Florin Ristei and Adina Răducan - Medley (Nunta, Salcia, Bună seara, iubite!), Trebuia să fii tu; Carla's Dreams - "Te rog", "Cum ne noi" with Delia

Round 2
Theme: Final

Ratings

References

X Factor (Romanian TV series)
Romania 05
2015 Romanian television seasons
Antena 1 (Romania) original programming